South Central Calhoun Community School District is a school district headquartered inside South Central Calhoun Middle School in Rockwell City, Iowa.

The district is mostly in Calhoun County, but also has sections in Carroll, Greene and Sac counties. It serves Rockwell City, Jolley, Lake City, Lohrville, Lytton, Yetter, and much of Lanesboro.

The district operates three schools: South Central Calhoun Elementary School in Rockwell City, South Central Calhoun Middle, and South Central Calhoun High School in Lake City.  it had 900 students.

History

The district formed on July 1, 2014, from the merger of the Rockwell City–Lytton Community School District and the Southern Cal Community School District. In 2009, the predecessor districts decided to begin sharing athletics and secondary grades, in which students from both districts attended each other districts' schools, and by 2012–13, all grade levels became shared. On Tuesday, February 5, 2013, the districts held an election on whether they would consolidate. The vote to consolidate was successful, with a 253–67 count in Rockwell City–Lytton and 340–86 in Southern Calhoun; a total of 746 people voted.

Jeff Kruse, who previously was the shared superintendent of the two predecessor districts, was the first superintendent; that year the East Sac County Community School District requested that the South Central Calhoun district share its superintendent with them. The South Central Calhoun leadership decided against this since it did not wish to suggest that it would eventually merge with another district so quickly after the district had formed; under Iowa law a district may only do grade-sharing with another district adjacent to it, and Iowa residents often see grade-sharing as an indication that a merger will eventually occur. However non-contiguous districts may share superintendents, and South Central Calhoun entered a superintendent-sharing agreement with a non-contiguous district, Laurens–Marathon Community School District.  Kruse was scheduled to leave at the end of the 2016–17 school year.

Brad Anderson was named superintendent in 2020.

Schools
The district operate three schools:
 South Central Calhoun Middle School, Rockwell City
 South Central Calhoun High School, Lake City
 South Central Calhoun Elementary, Rockwell City

South Central Calhoun High School

Athletics
The Titans compete in the Twin Lakes Conference in the following sports:

Cross country 
Volleyball 
Football 
Basketball
Wrestling 
Track and field
Golf 
Baseball 
Softball

See also
List of school districts in Iowa
List of high schools in Iowa

References

External links
 South Central Calhoun Community School District
 South Central Calhoun Community School District Independent Auditor's Reports Basic Financial Statements and Supplementary Information Schedule of Findings and Questioned Costs June 30, 2015

School districts in Iowa
Education in Calhoun County, Iowa
Education in Carroll County, Iowa
Education in Greene County, Iowa
Education in Sac County, Iowa
School districts established in 2014
2014 establishments in Iowa